Taigi Unicode is a TrueType font specifically designed to include the character combinations necessary to display Pe̍h-ōe-jī, a romanization for Taiwanese Hokkien.

References

External links
 - Download the font

Serif typefaces